Awadh Bihari Choudhary or Awadh Bihari Yadav is an Indian politician. He has been elected five times from Siwan constituency as a member of Janata Dal as well as Rashtriya Janata Dal. He is nominated as Bihar legislative speaker in August 2022 under Nitish Kumar-RJD led Mahagathbandhan. He is one of the most senior politicians in Rashtriya Janata Dal, also served as an Education Minister of Bihar in Rabri Devi government.

References

Bihar MLAs 1985–1990
Bihar MLAs 1990–1995
Bihar MLAs 1995–2000
Bihar MLAs 2000–2005
Bihari politicians
Rashtriya Janata Dal politicians
People from Siwan district
Living people
1954 births